was a Japanese jujutsu master of the Yoshin-ryū school. Under his leadership, the Totsuka-ha Yoshin-ryū was the largest jujutsu organization in Japan, as well as the last great school of this art, until the rise of Kodokan judo.

Biography
He was the elder son of Hidetsuka Totsuka, the founder of the Totsuka branch of Yoshin-ryū jujutsu. While he was learning the family art, Hikosuke served the feudal Numazu Domain in Suruga Province from 1830 until 1837, in which he inherited leadership of the Totsuka family. In 1860, his prestige in the teaching of jujutsu carried to him to an audience with Shogun Tokugawa Iemochi, whom Totsuka showed his style by performing kata in his presence. Iemochi was impressed, so Totsuka started working for the Tokugawa Shogunate as a jujutsu teacher at the Kobusho academy.

Around this time, he had contact with future Shinsengumi member Shinohara Yasunoshin, who stayed at Totsuka's house and discussed martial principles with him.

In 1861, Totsuka departed from the Kobusho due to political changes and decided to settle by himself in Tokyo, opening a system of dojos. Over time, the Totsuka-ha schools in the city were attended by 1.600 students, even although Totsuka moved his residence to Chiba after the 1868 Meiji Restoration. He worked as the main hand-to-hand teacher of the Chiba Police Department, but also taught several great exponents of his art, like Matashiro Kashiwazaki, Jujiro Aizawa, Taro Terushima and Teisuke Nishimura. In the 1880s, his Tokyo students became entangled with the rising Kodokan judo school during the Kodokan-Totsuka rivalry, but Totsuka himself would not see its end, dying of an illness in 1886 in midst of the confrontations.

He was succeeded by his adopted son Hidemi, who later joined Kodokan founder Jigoro Kano to form the jujutsu department of Dai Nippon Butoku Kai.

References

1813 births
1886 deaths
Japanese jujutsuka
Sportspeople from Edo State